Alfred Steux (born 24 May 1892 in Dottignies - died 9 August 1934 in Paris) was a Belgian road racing cyclist who participated in the 1919 Tour de France and finished ninth. He finished in tenth place in the 1919 Paris–Roubaix.

References

Belgian male cyclists
1892 births
1934 deaths
People from Mouscron
Cyclists from Hainaut (province)